Jeevana Nataka is a 1943 Indian Kannada film directed by Wahab Kashmiri, based on a play of the same name written by A. N. Krishna Rao. The film was produced by Gubbi Veeranna, his first as an independent producer. Veeranna also appeared in a lead role in the film alongside debutante Kemparaj Urs, Shanta Hublikar and B. Jayamma.

Cast
The cast of the film:

 Gubbi Veeranna as Anand
 D. Kemparaj Urs as Mohan
 Shanta Hublikar as Kamala
 B. Jayamma as Padma
 Singanallur Puttaswamayya
 Basavarajappa
 Mohana Kumari
 Muradi Kulla
 Entadi Lambu
 Rajamma
 Sundaramma
 Kamalamma
 Kamalabai
 Sundaribai
 Sharadamma
 Vijaya (credited as Baby Vijaya)
 M. G. Marirao
 Mahabala Rao
 Krishnamurthy
 B Hanumanthaiah
 Raju
 Radhakrishna
 M. C. Veer

Production
Wahab Kashmiri was a theatre personality working in Calcutta's New Theatre group. The film was his first in Kannada as director. The writer A. N. Krishna Rao, who wrote the film's story, assisted him by handing him over the story in English, and the dialogues. The film was also Gubbi Veeranna's first as an independent producer and produced under the banner Gubbi Films.

Future actor Rajkumar's father and stage actor Singanalluru Puttaswamayya was voice-tested for acting in the film. "Since his voice was rough and did not suit cinema, he was asked to dub for his voice by holding the mike far away from his mouth." D. Kemparaj Urs, the brother of future Chief Minister of Mysore State, D. Devaraj Urs, made his acting debut in the film. Filming took in Central Studios, Coimbatore, for a year before release on 1 January 1943.

Reception
The reviewer for The Indian Express wrote, "Apart from Veeranna's superb comedy, Jayamma and Shanta Hublikar put over grand performances. Lilting music is provided in plenty."

References

External links
 

1943 films
1940s Kannada-language films
Indian black-and-white films